The Yellow River is a river in northern Papua New Guinea.

See also
List of rivers of Papua New Guinea
Yellow River languages

References

Rivers of Papua New Guinea